The Heavy Entertainment Show is the eleventh studio album by English recording artist Robbie Williams. It was released on 4 November 2016 through Columbia Records. It features guest appearances from Rufus Wainwright and John Grant. The album was primarily produced by Williams' longtime songwriting partner Guy Chambers and Richard Flack, along with a variety of producers such as Stuart Price, Johnny McDaid and Gary Go.

The Heavy Entertainment Show was supported by three singles: "Party Like a Russian", "Love My Life" and "Mixed Signals", with the second topping the charts in Slovenia and Slovakia and being a top ten hit in five other countries. The album debuted atop the UK albums chart and stayed in the top 10 for three weeks. It also reached the top in 4 other countries. The album was promoted with "The Heavy Entertainment Show Tour", which started on 2 June 2017 in Manchester and ended on 17 November 2018 in Mexico City.

Background
In May 2016, it was announced that Robbie Williams had signed a recording contract with Sony Music. Williams said in a statement: "They're [Sony Music] inspired, I'm inspired. I'm more ready than I ever have been and I'm totally convinced I'm in the right place. I look forward to working on this album, which is an album I'm immensely proud of, in this exciting new partnership with Sony Music."

Composition 
Musically, The Heavy Entertainment Show is a pop album with elements of rock, swing, country and electro-pop. The third track "Mixed Signals" was co-written by all four members of the American alternative rock band the Killers, who also perform all instrumentation.

Release and promotion
The album was announced on 25 September 2016, the same day Williams performed at the Apple Music Festival in London. He told the crowd: "Today I announced my new album, it's called "The Heavy Entertainment Show. It's out on the 4th of November and you can pre-order it now. Enjoy", and sang two songs from the album that he had already performed on the "Let Me Entertain You Tour" and the "Swings Both Ways Live" tour, respectively: "Motherfucker" and "Sensational".

On the same day, the album's title track "The Heavy Entertainment Show" was released on Spotify and as an "instant grat" through the iTunes Store.

The album's first official single, "Party Like a Russian", was released on 30 September 2016. The second single, "Love My Life", was released on 20 October 2016.

On 7 November, Williams announced a concert tour titled The Heavy Entertainment Show Tour to promote the album. It began on 2 June 2017 in Manchester, England and ended in November 2018 in Mexico City.

Critical reception

The Heavy Entertainment Show received a Metacritic score of 59 based on 9 reviews, indicating "mixed or average reviews".

Neil Z. Yeung of AllMusic was highly positive in his 4-star review, saying "Aptly titled, Williams is entertaining as ever, a consummate showman until the end. The album is a grab bag of ideas, darting here and there in its pursuit of a hit. However, this isn't too much of a distraction, Mr Entertainment and his bombast do not disappoint. The Heavy Entertainment Show is his most invigorated album in years, a truer return to the pop realm than Take the Crown. Here, Williams dresses up his antics in expert production with plenty of cheekiness to spare."

Kitty Empire from The Observer gave a mixed three-star review stating, "Cheek, swagger and schmaltz, the tunes that could only come from Williams make this record entertaining, if a little groan worthy. The could-be-anybody songs just don't stick in the memory."

Tim Jonze from The Guardian gave a negative two-star review and said, "A lurching mess of styles, it lurches from one thing to the next, be that MOR balladry, glam rock or orchestral show tunes."

Commercial performance
Two days before the album was released in the Netherlands, Williams received a gold edition of the album during his appearance on RTL Late Night on 2 November 2016 for over 20,000 pre-orders of the album in the country. It debuted at number 1 on the UK album's chart with combined first week sales of 67,000 copies sold.

Track listing

Notes
  signifies an additional producer

Charts

Weekly charts

Year-end charts

Certifications

!scope="row"|Worldwide (IFPI)
|
|700,000+

References

2016 albums
Columbia Records albums
Robbie Williams albums